This is a list of mines in Alberta, Canada.

Alberta